Shchukino District is an administrative district (raion) of North-Western Administrative Okrug, and one of the 125 administrative districts of the federal city of Moscow, Russia. It borders with Pokrovskoye-Streshnevo District in the south, Strogino District in the east, Khoroshevo-Mnevniki District in the north, and in the west there is the boundary between North-Western and Northern Administrative Okrugs. Population:

History
In 1415, Vasily I of the Grand Duchy of Moscow built the village of Shchukino to the east of the Moskva River.

1945-1991
 
After the war and before the beginning of mass building of the 1960s there has continued the residential construction in the Oktyabrskoye Pole district (already at 5 floors) and a development of scientific establishments. Near the Kurchatov Institute there had been originated the A.Bochvar Institute of Inorganic Materials. The "journey of two academics" (Maximov  street) has divided two "nuclear" territories. Nearby, there has set the stage of the Research Institute of Instrumentation on the Raspletin street and at the north, the Institute of Virology and Epidemiology was constructed on a Gamalei street. There were built cottage towns for management of the institutes on the Rogov street, Pehotnaya street and Aviacionnaya street. Most of them were demolished in the early 1980s. The Hospital № 6 was built for professors and management who worked on the atomic projects at the Novoschukinskaya street. Separate "Stalinist" houses have appeared on the Jivopisnaya street, the Kurchatov Square, the Zhadova Square and on adjacent streets.

Mass buildings of the Shchukino district has affected the village Shchukino (Aviacionnaya street, Novoschukinskaya street), and some neighborhoods on the Maximova street, Biruzova street and others. Mostly it was completed in the 1970s. In the late 1970s the large-scale construction has shifted on the west to the Strogino district where was set the stage of the Stroginsky bridge in 1981.

Modernity 
 The "Fifth Avenue" shopping center located on the Marshal Birjuzova street. There are a multiplex cinema "Cinema Park on Oktyabrskoye Pole", a food court, shops, a billiard club, supermarket "Crossroads", an underground parking.
 "Shchuka" (Pike) shopping center located on the Marshala Vasilevskogo street. You can enter from the "Schukinskaya" metro station without going outside. This complex is one of the largest shopping centers located within the Ring Road. There is a multiplex cinema "Karo Film", a bowling alley, a food court, shops of different price categories, the "Alie Parusa" (Scarlet Sails) supermarket.
A large objects on the territory of the district is the "Alie Parusa".

Shchukino became a district in 1918 and has been a part of North-Western Administrative Okrug since 1988.

Notable streets
Marshala Koneva Street
Akademika Kurchatova Square
Aviatsionnata Street
Pekhotnaya Street
Marshala Biryuzova Street

References

Districts of Moscow
North-Western Administrative Okrug